Harry Kirby McClintock (October 8, 1884 – April 24, 1957), also known as "Haywire Mac", was an American railroad man, radio personality, actor, singer, songwriter, and poet, best known for his song "Big Rock Candy Mountain".

Life
Harry McClintock was born on October 8, 1884, in Uhrichsville, Ohio. Both his parents were from nearby Tippecanoe, Ohio; however, his family moved to Knoxville, Tennessee soon after his birth. In his youth, McClintock ran away from home to join the circus and drifted from place to place throughout his life. He railroaded in Africa, worked as a seaman, supplied food and ammunition to American soldiers while working as a civilian mule-train packer in the Philippines, and in 1899 worked as an aid to newsmen in China covering the Boxer Rebellion.

In America, Mac traveled as a railroader and minstrel. He worked for numerous railroads during his life, including:

 Pittsburgh, Fort Wayne and Chicago Railway as a brakeman in the Pittsburgh area (1905–1909)
 Chicago, Burlington & Quincy Railroad Company as a switchman (1910)
 Denver & Rio Grande Western Railroad as a switchman in Green River (1913)
 Oregon Short Line Railroad Company as a delivery helper in Utah (1913–1917)
 Southern Pacific (1917)
 Tooele Valley Railway, Salt Lake City, Utah (1917)
 Union Pacific Railroad Company as a brakeman in Colorado (1917)
 Railway Express Agency as an express handler in San Francisco (1920–1922)
 State Belt Railroad as an engine foreman in San Francisco (1922–1925)
 Outer Harbor Terminal Railway Company as a member of the Home Guard in San Pedro (1938–1943)

On October 8, 1917, McClintock married Bessie K. Johnson in Farmington City, Utah. They had one daughter.

Radio and music
In 1925, McClintock participated in a KFRC Radio talent contest. His performance of his song "Big Rock Candy Mountain" won him spots on two new KFRC radio shows: a children's program called "Mac and His Gang" where he sang popular cowboy songs with his "Haywire Orchestry", and a variety program called the "Blue Monday Jamboree", which he hosted alongside Meredith Willson, Bea Benaderet, Edna Fischer, and future I Love Lucy producer Jess Oppenheimer. McClintock was also a member of Al Pearce's "The Happy Go Lucky Hour", a KFRC spin-off of "Blue Monday Jamboree", alongside Edna Fischer and Tommy Harris.

"The Big Rock Candy Mountain" reached No. 1 on Billboard's "Hillbilly Hits" chart in 1939. The song was featured in the 2000 Coen brothers' film O Brother, Where Art Thou?. McClintock's song "The Old Chisholm Trail" was featured in the end credits of The Grandest Enterprise Under God episode (Episode 5) of the TV documentary miniseries The West. He was included in Robert Crumb's series of "Heroes of Blues, Jazz and Country" trading cards.

Politics
McClintock was an active spellbinder for the Industrial Workers of the World (IWW). He served with W.F. Little in the Fresno Free Speech Fight from January 12 to March 4, 1911, and participated in the Tucker Utah strike on June 14, 1913, with Joe Hill. McClintock wrote the marching song of the IWW, "Hallelujah, I'm a Bum", and is credited with being the first person to sing Hill's song "The Preacher and the Slave" in public. In the early 1920s, McClintock worked and organized union men in the oil fields of West Texas, where he met and recruited author Jim Thompson, who later incorporated him into several short stories using the name "Strawlegs Martin".

Memberships
 Initiated by W.F. Little into IWW Union No. 66 on March 4, 1911.
 Deputy Sheriff, San Francisco, California, deputized on February 7, 1930.
 Screen Actors Guild, was inducted as a member on May 5, 1939.
 American Society of Composers, Authors and Publishers (ASCAP), was inducted as a member on September 30, 1940.

Selected discography

78s

LPs

Compilations

Bibliography
"Haywire Mac and the Big Rock Candy Mountain" (Stillhouse Hollow Publishers Inc., Copyright 1981) By Henry Young. Santa Fe Railway locomotive engineer Retired Oct. 31, 1974.

Stories
"Railroaders are Tough" (Railroad Magazine, April, 1943)
"Boomer and Their Women" (Railroad Magazine, December, 1957)

Articles
"New Publications – Railroad Songs of Yesteryear" (Railroad Magazine, August 1943) Short biography is part of review.

Notes

References

External links
Harry McClintock biography
Harry McClintock at AllMusic.
 
 

1882 births
1957 deaths
American country singer-songwriters
American country guitarists
American male guitarists
American male composers
20th-century American composers
Industrial Workers of the World members
People from Knoxville, Tennessee
Singer-songwriters from Tennessee
Guitarists from Tennessee
20th-century American singers
Country musicians from Tennessee
20th-century guitarists
20th-century American male musicians